Thomas Mermillod-Blondin (born 3 January 1984) is a former World Cup alpine ski racer from France. Born in Annecy, Haute-Savoie, he primarily competed in super-G, but his best results were in the super combined event: he took five of his six World Cup podiums in combined, with the other coming in super-G. Mermillod-Blondin made his World Cup debut in 2007 and represented France at the 2010 Winter Olympics in Vancouver and the 2011 World Championships. He made a total of 179 World Cup starts in his career. In February 2019 Mermillod-Blondin announced that he would retire from competition following a combined race in Bansko, Bulgaria that month.

World Cup results

Season standings

World Cup podiums
6 podiums – (4 SC, 1 K, 1 SG)

World Championship results

Olympic results

References

External links
 
 Thomas Mermillod Blondin World Cup standings at the International Ski Federation
 
 
  
 French Ski Team – 2016 men's A team 
 Thomas Mermillod-Blondin at Rossignol.com

1984 births
French male alpine skiers
Alpine skiers at the 2010 Winter Olympics
Alpine skiers at the 2014 Winter Olympics
Alpine skiers at the 2018 Winter Olympics
Olympic alpine skiers of France
Living people
Université Savoie-Mont Blanc alumni
Sportspeople from Annecy